The 2nd Goodwood Trophy was a non-championship Formula One motor race held at Goodwood Circuit on 17 September 1949. The race was held over 10 laps and was won by Reg Parnell in a Maserati 4CLT/48. Parnell also set fastest lap. ERA drivers Peter Walker and Bob Gerard were second and third.

Classification

Race

References

Goodwood Trophy
1949 in English sport
1949 in British motorsport